Ets variant 5 (ETV5) (also named ERM transcription factor) is a transcription factor that in humans is encoded by the ETV5 gene. It is generated in Sertoli cells, which are found in the testes and play a crucial role in spermatogenesis. Its ortholog has been linked to both obesity and bipolar disorder.

References

Further reading

External links
 
 

Transcription factors